Heidi Elisabeth Ellingsen (born 28 July 1998) is a Norwegian footballer who plays as a midfielder for Damallsvenskan club Linköping and the Norway women's national team.

References

1998 births
Living people
People from Lier, Norway
Norwegian women's footballers
Women's association football midfielders
Lyn Fotball Damer players
Stabæk Fotball Kvinner players
LSK Kvinner FK players
Toppserien players
Norway women's youth international footballers
Norway women's international footballers
Linköpings FC players
Damallsvenskan players
Norwegian expatriate women's footballers
Expatriate women's footballers in Sweden
Norwegian expatriate sportspeople in Sweden
Sportspeople from Viken (county)